Frank Novak  (born March 4, 1945) is an American character actor who has made dozens of film and television appearances in Independence Day, Newsies, Breast Men, Seinfeld, CSI: Crime Scene Investigation, NYPD Blue, Becker, Charmed, Diagnosis Murder, Party of Five, Monk, and Las Vegas. He gave a memorable performance as General Douglas MacArthur in the miniseries The Korean War made for Chinese television, and played Henry Kissinger in the science fiction epic Watchmen.

Theatre work

Novak has appeared in numerous theatrical productions including A Cat Among Pigeons, as Lenny in Of Mice and Men for the Santa Susanna Repertory Company, the title role in King Lear at the Basement Theater, and as the mob boss Salvadore Lombardi in Jon Mullich's adaptation of A Servant of Two Masters, set in Prohibition-era Chicago.

Filmography

I Am Joe's Eye (1983)
Silent Night, Deadly Night Part 2 (1987) - Loan Shark
Street Soldiers (1991)
Newsies (1992) - Policeman
Sleepwalkers (1992) - Deputy Sheriff
Body Chemistry II: The Voice of a Stranger (1992) - Mahoney
Stepmonster (1993) - Fire Captain
Carnosaur (1993) - Jesse Paloma
Seinfeld - "The Dinner Party" (1994) - Liquor Store Clerk
The Force (1994) - Booking Officer
Watchers III (1994) - Stratten
Night of the Running Man (1995) - Conductor
The Nature of the Beast (1995) - Manfred
Independence Day (1996) - Teddy
Breast Men (1997) - Earl
What's Cooking? (2000) - Governor Rhoads
Shadow Hours (2000) - Husband
Cahoots (2001) - Charlie
Rennie's Landing (2001) - Bank Manager
Role of a Lifetime (2001) - Desk Sergeant
Scorcher (2002) - City Engineer
Air Marshal (2003) - General Watkins
Undercover Kids (2004) - Grandpa
Rumor Has It... (2005) - Party Guest
The Fall of Night (2007) - Joe's father
Necessary Evil (2008) - Army General
Watchmen (2009) - Henry Kissinger
Hollywoo (2011) - Vieil homme entrée Palace Hotel
Area 51 (2015) - Frank Novak

External links

1945 births
American male film actors
American male television actors
Male actors from Chicago
Living people